James Robinson McCormick House is a historic home located at Farmington, St. Francois County, Missouri.  It was built circa 1875 for former United States Congressman James Robinson McCormick, and is a two-story, "L"-shaped, vernacular Greek Revival style red brick I-house with a rear ell.  It has a low-pitched gable roof with wide bands of cornice molding and measures approximately 44 feet, 6 inches, wide and 64 feet, 4 inches, long.  It features a single-story white portico supported by six white square columns.  Also on the property is a contributing small brick wash house.

It was added to the National Register of Historic Places in 1998.

References

Houses on the National Register of Historic Places in Missouri
Greek Revival houses in Missouri
Houses completed in 1875
Buildings and structures in St. Francois County, Missouri
National Register of Historic Places in St. Francois County, Missouri